Shiloh-Marion Baptist Church and Cemetery is a historic place in Buena Vista, Georgia.

The Greek Revival style church building was constructed in 1835 and added to the National Register of Historic Places in 1984.

It is a one-story one-room wood-frame building with a gable roof, on stone piers.  It is covered with weatherboard siding and has no exterior ornamentation.

One reason the church was deemed significant is that it represents the former community of Church Hill.  It is the only surviving structure of the community, which once had five churches plus an academy.  It had a phone line in 1885 and it had a post office until 1903.  Its NRHP nomination notes an association to the Christian Union faith:In religious history, the church is important for representing the intensity of churches that once existed here, including the important Christian Union faith, which was founded by the Reverend George Lynch Smith. It had all of its few churches in this area. It is important that in the deep, tradition-rooted antebellum South, a minister could gather a flock, albeit small, around the tenets of a new faith, an offshoot of the Church of Christ movement. Although it lasted only a few decades, it is important in Georgia's religious heritage, and this is the only vestige of the community in which it was located. Traditional accounts are that many meetings were held in other church structures, for the Christian Union faith did not always have its own churches. Thus, some of their meetings had to be held in other churches, such as this one.

References

Baptist cemeteries in the United States
Baptist churches in Georgia (U.S. state)
Churches on the National Register of Historic Places in Georgia (U.S. state)
Churches completed in 1835
19th-century Baptist churches in the United States
Buildings and structures in Marion County, Georgia
Cemeteries on the National Register of Historic Places in Georgia (U.S. state)
National Register of Historic Places in Marion County, Georgia